Jean Kieffer (6 June 1909 – 1 December 1961) was a Luxembourgian boxer. He competed in the men's flyweight event at the 1928 Summer Olympics.

References

1909 births
1961 deaths
Luxembourgian male boxers
Olympic boxers of Luxembourg
Boxers at the 1928 Summer Olympics
People from Colmar-Berg
Flyweight boxers